Descendants is an American musical fantasy adventure-comedy television film directed and choreographed by Kenny Ortega. The film stars Dove Cameron, Sofia Carson, Booboo Stewart, and Cameron Boyce as the teenage children of Maleficent, the Evil Queen, Jafar, and Cruella de Vil, respectively. The film follows these teenagers adjusting to life outside their island prison, while on a mission to steal the Fairy Godmother's wand and free their parents from captivity. It debuted on July 31, 2015, as a Disney Channel Original Movie, to positive reviews and 6.6 million viewers.

The film also stars Mitchell Hope, Melanie Paxson, Brenna D'Amico, Sarah Jeffery, Zachary Gibson, Jedidiah Goodacre, Dianne Doan, Dan Payne, Keegan Connor Tracy, Wendy Raquel Robinson, Maz Jobrani, Kathy Najimy, and Kristin Chenoweth.

The first installment in the Descendants franchise, Descendants was spun off into a CGI animated short-form series titled Descendants: Wicked World, and was followed by a sequel, Descendants 2, which premiered on July 21, 2017, and a third film, Descendants 3, which premiered August 2, 2019.

Plot
Belle and Beast have married and become king and queen. Following the establishment of the United States of Auradon, they have created a prosperous new nation from the surrounding kingdoms, and banished the villains to the Isle of the Lost, an island slum surrounded by a barrier where magic is suspended. Now, twenty years later, their son, Ben, who will soon be crowned king, announces that his first proclamation is to give four selected children from the Isle of the Lost a chance to live in Auradon, away from the influence of their villainous parents, despite his father's protests. He chooses Carlos, son of Cruella de Vil; Jay, son of Jafar; Evie, daughter of the Evil Queen; and Mal, daughter of Maleficent. On the island, Maleficent instructs the quartet to steal the Fairy Godmother's magic wand to release the barrier so she can take over Auradon.

Traveling to Auradon Preparatory, the four meet Ben and his self-proclaimed girlfriend Audrey, daughter of Princess Aurora. They also meet the Fairy Godmother, the school's headmistress. Evie uses her mother's pocket-sized magic mirror to locate the wand in a nearby museum, and Mal uses her mother's spinning wheel from the museum to put the security guard to sleep, but they fail to steal the wand due to a barrier around it. After learning that the Fairy Godmother will use the wand at Ben's coronation, the four wait it out by attending classes, but start to fit in with the students. Jay is recruited into the school's "tourney" team (a sport similar to field hockey, hurling and lacrosse), while Carlos overcomes his fear of dogs by befriending the school's dog, Dude. Evie, though intelligent, acts vain to impress Chad, Cinderella's son, but ends up doing his homework for him. Dopey's son, Doug, encourages her not to pander to others and be herself.

Mal becomes popular, using Maleficent's spell book to improve the looks of Jane and Lonnie, the daughters of the Fairy Godmother and Mulan, respectively. Jane in particular dislikes her looks, especially because her mother won't use her own magic to change them. Learning that Ben's "girlfriend" will be seated close to the wand during the coronation, which is used during the ceremony, Mal bakes a cookie laced with a love potion and gives it to Ben, who falls madly in love with her, much to the shock of his friends, particularly Audrey. On a date with Ben, Mal becomes conflicted with her growing inner goodness and desire to please her mother, unsure of how to react to Ben's feelings towards her. During the school's family day, the villains' children are ostracized after an encounter with Audrey's grandmother, Queen Leah, who hates Mal because Maleficent's curse was the reason she missed Aurora's childhood, prompting an argument that drives Mal to end the beauty spell she used on Jane. Ben tries to reassure them that everything will be okay after the coronation. Doug tries to remain friendly towards Evie, but Chad forces him to distance himself from her.

At Ben's coronation, Mal gives him a brownie containing the love spell's antidote, believing it is unnecessary to keep him under the spell. It turns out, per Ben's admission, that he was already freed of the spell since their date when he went swimming in the Enchanted Lake, believing that Mal only did it because she really liked him. However, much to Mal's surprise, it turns out Ben has had feelings for her all along. During Ben's crowning, a disillusioned Jane grabs the wand from her mother, wanting to improve her beauty, only for her to accidentally destroy the Isle's barrier. Mal takes the wand from Jane, but torn over what to do, is encouraged by Ben to make her own choice rather than follow Maleficent's path. Mal recognizes that she and her friends have found happiness in Auradon and they choose to be good.

Maleficent crashes the coronation ceremony, freezing everyone except Mal, Evie, Jay and Carlos. When they defy her, Maleficent transforms into a dragon. Mal and her friends use a counterspell, turning Maleficent into a lizard, her tiny size based on the amount of love in her heart. Mal returns the Fairy Godmother her wand as she unfreezes everyone and tells her not to be hard on Jane. While the villains watch the celebration from afar, Auradon Prep's students party through the night. Mal's eyes turn green as she addresses the audience, telling them the story is not over yet.

Cast

 Dove Cameron as Mal, daughter of Maleficent
 Cameron Boyce as Carlos, son of Cruella de Vil
 Booboo Stewart as Jay, son of Jafar
 Sofia Carson as Evie, daughter of Evil Queen 
Mitchell Hope as Ben, son of Queen Belle and Beast
 Melanie Paxson as Fairy Godmother from Cinderella, the headmistress of Auradon Prep and Jane's mother
 Brenna D'Amico as Jane, daughter of Fairy Godmother
 Sarah Jeffery as Audrey, daughter of Princess Aurora and Prince Phillip
 Zachary Gibson as Doug, son of Dopey from Snow White and the Seven Dwarfs
 Jedidiah Goodacre as Chad Charming, son of Cinderella and Prince Charming
 Dianne Doan as Lonnie, daughter of Fa Mulan and Li Shang
 Dan Payne as Beast from Beauty and the Beast, king of Auradon and Ben's father
 Keegan Connor Tracy as Belle from Beauty and the Beast, queen of Auradon and Ben's mother
 Wendy Raquel Robinson as Cruella de Vil from One Hundred and One Dalmatians, Carlos' mother
 Maz Jobrani as Jafar from Aladdin, Jay's father who owns his own junk shop
 Kathy Najimy as Evil Queen from Snow White and the Seven Dwarfs, Evie's mother who still has issues with her stepdaughter, Snow White
 Kristin Chenoweth as Maleficent from Sleeping Beauty, Mal's mother who is known as the worst and cruelest villain in Auradon

Additionally, Judith Maxie portrays Queen Leah, Princess Audrey's grandmother.

Production
On December 12, 2013, Disney Channel announced the production of the film and released the plot outline. Kenny Ortega, a director who has previously worked with Disney Channel on the High School Musical trilogy, was announced to be directing the film. The script was written by Josann McGibbon and Sara Parriott. Filming began in the spring of 2014. Filming took place in Vancouver and in locations such as Hatley Castle and the British Columbia Parliament Buildings in Victoria, Canada.  The costumes were designed by Kara Saun.

Broadcast
Descendants made its debut on Family Channel in Canada on July 31, 2015, simultaneously with the United States. It was also the last Disney Channel Original Movie to air in Canada on Family after the launch of a Disney Channel there. The film premiered on August 1, 2015 on Disney Channel in Australia and New Zealand and on September 25, 2015 on Disney Channel in the United Kingdom and Ireland. In the Middle East and Africa, the film premiered on September 18, 2015 on the English feed of Disney Channel. It premiered in Turkey on October 17, 2015 on Disney Channel.

Home media
Descendants was released on DVD on August 18, 2015. According to The Numbers, the domestic DVD sales are $18,241,833.

Reception

Critical reception
Descendants received positive reviews from critics. Isabella Biedenharn of Entertainment Weekly gave the film a "B" grade, saying "... plot isn't really the point. The fun is in the roll call... It's no High School Musical, but the songs are catchy, and the junior villains are worth rooting for." Tisha Mae Eaton of Moviepilot.com stated, "It's a movie that definitely had the feel of a Disney classic with a modern twist and I highly recommend it." Alex Reif of LaughingPlace.com gave it a score of 4.5 out of 5 saying, "... I highly recommend this to any Disney fan, if for no other reason than to see what they've done with the characters, the Hocus Pocus references, and Kristin Chenoweth's Maleficent which is closer to the animated character than Angelina Jolie's portrayal." Brian Lowry of Variety called it "... a playful and tuneful TV movie, exhibiting much higher ambitions than, say, the Teen Beach franchise." By contrast, Amy Amatangelo of The Hollywood Reporter gave it a mixed review, calling it "High School Musical meets Once Upon a Time. It smartly ushers little girls who have grown up watching Disney movies into the tween audience and is an idea so ripe for merchandising that the Disney Store is already chock-full of Descendants costumes, dolls and T-shirts." She called the story "flimsy", but singled out the performances of Chenoweth, Najimy, Robinson and Jobrani.

 The website's critical consensus reads, "Memorable songs and excellent casting help turn Descendants into a decidedly wicked musical romp."

Ratings
Before the film made its TV debut, it was viewed more than one million times on the Watch Disney Channel app.

It was viewed by 6.6 million people on its premiere night and 10.5 million viewers in Early DVR Playback. Shortly after the premier air date, ratings showed the film was the fifth most watched original movie in cable history.

In Australia, the film attracted 151,000 viewers, making it the sixth highest-rated broadcast on pay television on its premiere day. The British premiere was watched by 827,000 viewers, making it the most-watched broadcast on Disney Channel of that week and month. The viewers rose to 1.45 million in 28 days, making it the highest viewership ever on the network.

Accolades

Franchise

Sequels

During the 2015 D23 Expo, Disney announced that a sequel to Descendants had been ordered. The news was made official on the Disney Channel Facebook page on October 15, 2015. Deadline reported that Parriott and McGibbon would reprise their duties as screenwriters and executive producers and that all of the cast from the first film was expected to return. On June 10, 2016, it was announced that China Anne McClain would join the sequel as Ursula's daughter, Uma.

On February 16, 2018, Disney Channel announced a third film in the series, Descendants 3, which premiered on August 2, 2019.

Prequel spin-off

Before the film's premiere air date, Disney Channel announced a live action mini series leading up to the event. Every day leading up to the release of the film, a new episode of Descendants: School of Secrets would be released revealing more secrets about the students at Auradon Prep. Each episode of the series is under 5 minutes long, with 23 episodes in total.

Animated spin-off

Right after the film finished airing on Disney Channel, it was announced that a CGI-animated short spinoff titled Descendants: Wicked World would be released on September 18, 2015. Furthermore, former Phineas and Ferb storyboard artist Aliki Theofilopoulos Grafft announced on Twitter that she was directing the series, with Jenni Cook as producer, and that the original cast would be reprising their roles.

Television special 
Disney Channel announced a television special titled Descendants: The Royal Wedding which premiered on August 13, 2021.

Soundtrack

Descendants (Original TV Movie Soundtrack) is a soundtrack album by cast of Descendants, released on July 31, 2015 by Walt Disney Records. The soundtrack peaked at number 1 in United States at Billboard 200, number one on the US Top Digital Albums and topped the US Top Soundtracks.

References

External links 

 
 

2015 comedy-drama films
2010s musical films
2015 television films
2015 films
2010s fantasy comedy films
Adventure crossover films
American adventure comedy films
American crossover films
American fantasy comedy films
American teen comedy films
Comedy crossover films
Fantasy crossover films
Descendants (franchise)
Disney Channel Original Movie films
Films based on fairy tales
Films directed by Kenny Ortega
Films shot in Vancouver
Musical television films
2010s American films